Colby O'Donis Colón (born March 14, 1989) is an American singer and actor. He is best known as the featured artist in Lady Gaga's 2008 single "Just Dance", which spent more than eleven months on the Billboard Hot 100. He is also known for his lead single on his debut album Colby O titled "What You Got" (featuring Akon), which peaked at number 14 on the Hot 100, and being featured on Akon's song "Beautiful", which peaked at number 19 on the Hot 100.

Early life 
O'Donis was born in Queens, New York, and grew up there and in Florida. He is of Puerto Rican and Italian descent. His mother, Olga, is a singer once crowned Miss Puerto Rico in New York, and his father, Freddy "Fast Freddy" Colón is a New York disc jockey who worked on New York station WQHT. He was named after Colby O'Donis, a firefighter who was killed while saving his father's life. O'Donis has one sister who is five years older. He has stated that, for seven years, she helped pay for his dance, piano, and guitar lessons out of her own paychecks. His parents first realized his singing talent when he took first place at a talent show by singing a Michael Jackson song when he was only three and a half.

Career

1997–2007: Beginnings 
When O'Donis was eight, his parents relocated to Orlando, Florida, and a year later, he began collaborating with the production group Full Force, the same group that had worked with Backstreet Boys, NSYNC, and Britney Spears. O'Donis' rise to fame began at age ten, when he became the youngest recording artist ever signed to Motown in order to do a song for a major motion picture soundtrack. The song, titled "Mouse in the House", was featured on the Stuart Little soundtrack. Soon after, he began taking guitar lessons with Johan Oiested, a musician in Carlos Santana's rhythm section. At the age of eleven, he was making regular appearances as an actor on the television series Grandpa's Garage. At age twelve, his father bought him his first production studio, and by the time he had reached fourteen, O'Donis was opening local Florida shows for major recording artists, including Backstreet Boys, Brian McKnight, 98 Degrees, Britney Spears, and Ne-Yo. Shortly after his fifteenth birthday, O'Donis' parents made the decision to relocate to Los Angeles, California, and pursue a recording deal. After this move, O'Donis was introduced to Genuine Music Group, where he began collaborating on producing an LP album consisting of songs from his catalog and songs co-written by producers Damon Sharpe, Gregg Pagani, and Brion James.

In 2006, O'Donis almost signed a record deal with Babyface. However, before the deal was finalized, O'Donis' management set up a meeting between O'Donis and Akon. They got in the studio where O'Donis played Akon his first demo of fourteen songs, and Akon loved and "really connected with it". A few weeks later, they set up a session and began working on music where O'Donis said they had really good chemistry from the start. At this time, Akon told O'Donis that he was starting his own label, called Konvict Muzik, and asked if he wanted to be a part of it. O'Donis agreed and, for the next two years, he waited for the label to "get going and achieve the stature they need to launch new artists" before being officially signed.

O'Donis has said that, before he signed with Interscope Records and Akon, he had already released six independent record albums.

2008–2009: Breakthrough with "Just Dance" and debut album 
O'Donis's first single, "What You Got", featuring Akon, was released on February 26, 2008, and his second single, titled "Don't Turn Back", was released on June 24, 2008. Both singles were released for digital download via iTunes and are featured on his debut album, Colby O. O'Donis was also featured on Lady Gaga's debut single, "Just Dance", earning him a nomination for Best Dance Recording at the 50th Annual Grammy Awards. To date, this has been his most successful single.

In 2009, O'Donis and Gaga won Best Dance Recording at the Teen Choice Awards for "Just Dance". He also performed a duet with Brooke Hogan entitled "Hey Yo!" later that year, in addition to his single "I Wanna Touch You" being released to radio. The music video for the latter premiered on July 27, 2009. Also in that year, he was featured in the Akon song "Beautiful".

2010–present: Later career and Start Over 
In 2010, O'Donis was featured in a song called "What You Waiting For" by Malaysian artist Mizz Nina, which has received extensive airplay in Malaysia and other Southeast Asian countries. He also released another single, "Texting Flirtation".

The following year, O'Donis signed with Z-Entertainment Records and released the digital single "Like Me". The music video premiered on February 9, 2012, on YouTube.

In 2013, after what he described as "a 4-year hiatus", O'Donis began working on his second studio album, titled Start Over. He released singles "Lean", "Turn This Night Around", "Come Back", "State of Mind", and "Kiss Those Lips" to promote the album.  Although planned for a release date in early 2014, the album was never released.

In March 2020, he took to Instagram to announce that he would be working on new music amidst the COVID-19 pandemic. His single "Hold On" was released on March 14.

Artistry 
O'Donis grew up listening to the Temptations, Luther Vandross, Michael Jackson, Justin Timberlake, Usher, and Mario.

Personal life 
O'Donis married Erin Yvonne, a dancer, actress and life coach on November 21, 2016. In October 2019, the couple welcomed their daughter Alina Cruz.

Discography 

 Colby O (2008)

Filmography

Awards and nominations

References 

1989 births
Living people
21st-century American singers
21st-century American male singers
American child singers
American male pop singers
American people of Italian descent
American people of Puerto Rican descent
American contemporary R&B singers
Hispanic and Latino American musicians
People from Queens, New York
Singers from New York City
Singers from Orlando, Florida
Songwriters from Florida
Songwriters from New York (state)
American male songwriters